Lago di San Domenico is a lake in the Province of L'Aquila, Abruzzo, Italy.

Lakes of Abruzzo